Worlds Apart is the second and final album of the American rock band Blackjack. The album was met with nearly total indifference, sold poorly and Blackjack disbanded shortly after its release.

The album contains the song "Welcome to the World", which opens with a live audio recording clip of a baby birth. A YouTube user by the name of Chris Cassone, engineer for Blackjack's band manager Phil Lorito, wrote on YouTube that the audio clip was of the birth of his son. Cassone made the recording (March 29, 1980) of his first wife, Dale Weigel Cassone, in White Plains Hospital during the delivery. Phil Lorito and members of Blackjack frequented nearby North Lake Sound Studios where Chris was chief engineer. Chris played the newly recorded tape at a recording session visited by Blackjack and they loved it. Casey Cassone, the boy born on the recording, received album liner credit from the band. The nurse coincidentally announces after he was born, "Open your eyes. Welcome to the world."

Jay-Z sampled the song "Stay" for his song "A Dream" from his 2002 album The Blueprint 2: The Gift & the Curse which reached No. 1 on the Billboard 200.

In 2004, Kanye West re-recorded a section of "Maybe It's the Power of Love" for inclusion on his song "Never Let Me Down"; it was released on his triple platinum selling debut album The College Dropout which peaked at No. 2 on the Billboard 200. Speaking to the website Genius in 2015, Bolton gave his approval of the sampling, stating that "the song turned out beautifully."

Track listing

Personnel
Michael Bolton - lead & backing vocals
Bruce Kulick - lead & rhythm guitars
Jimmy Haslip - bass, backing vocals
Sandy Gennaro - drums, percussion

Additional personnel
Jan Mullaney - keyboards
Chuck Kirkpatrick - backing vocals
Tonny Battaglia - backing vocals
Eric Troyer - backing vocals
Eddy Offord - production & engineering
Rob Davis - engineering

References

External links

1980 albums
Albums produced by Eddy Offord
Polydor Records albums